Soběslav Pinkas, originally Hippolyt Karel Maria František Pinkas (7 October 1827,  Prague - 30 December 1901, Prague) was a Czech genre painter and political caricaturist.

Biography
His father, was a politician and, later, a leading figure in the Revolutions of 1848. After completing his basic education, he studied law. At that time, he changed his name to "Soběslav" to show his support for Czech nationalism. He is believed to have been among the group of students that held Count Leopold von Thun hostage during the June Uprising.

In 1849, after the revolution was suppressed, he found it necessary to change careers and enrolled at the Academy of Fine Arts where he worked in the studios of Christian Ruben. In 1854, he received a scholarship to study in France, where he worked in the studios of Thomas Couture. While there, he exhibited at the Salon, got married, and came under the influence of Jean-François Millet. He also was a frequent visitor to the art colony in Bourron-Marlotte.

He returned to Bohemia after his father's death in 1865 to look after his family. Later, he accepted a position as a drawing teacher, which he held for twenty-five years. He also taught courses for women at the Academy's graduate school and participated in planning the National Theater. Throughout his later years, he maintained his contacts with France; working for the Alliance Française and contributing to publications such as Le Siècle and Le Soleil. In 1885, he built a cottage in Sázava, where he had been impressed by the scenery. Four years after his death, the actor George Voskovec, his grandson, was born at that cottage.

Selected paintings

References

Further reading 

 Soběslav Hippolyt Pinkas, 1827-1901. Quido Mánes, 1828-1880 (exhibition catalog) Sept.-Nov. 1977, Regional Gallery of Fine Arts in Zlín
 Ceský realismus: Karel Purkyně, Soběslav Pinkas, Viktor Barvitius, Adolf Kosárek (exhibition catalog) May-Sept. 1978, Aleš South Bohemian Gallery
 Soběslav Pinkas, český malíř (1827 - 1901) Thesis by Kristýna Brožová, Charles University in Prague (2012)

External links 

 "Prayer for a Hanged Man" (the Hangman?) @ Alšova jihočeská galerie
 MKG Hamburg: Collection Online: Daguerreotype of Hippolyt Pinkas

1827 births
1901 deaths
Artists from Prague
Genre painters
Czech nationalism
19th-century Czech painters
Czech male painters
Czech caricaturists
Czech cartoonists
19th-century Czech male artists